Mindo Chocolate Makers is a small batch bean-to-bar chocolate maker based in Dexter, Michigan.  The company was founded in 2009 by Barbara Wilson and Joseph Meza. Mindo Chocolate Makers is named for the town of Mindo, Ecuador where Joe and Barbara own and operate a small hostel and café named El Quetzal de Mindo.

See also
 List of bean-to-bar chocolate manufacturers

References

External links
 Official website

Brand name chocolate
Confectionery companies of the United States
Food and drink companies based in Michigan
Food and drink companies established in 2009
2009 establishments in Michigan